Chaves Municipality may refer to:

Places

Brazil
 Chaves, Brazil, a municipality in the State of Pará

Portugal
 Chaves Municipality, Portugal, a municipality in the district of Vila Real

Municipality name disambiguation pages